Boukhalfa Branci (born 18 June 1952) was a professional Algerian footballer who played as a goalkeeper.

Life and career

Honours

Clubs
 USM Alger (196?–197?)

References

External links
Profile on djazairess.com site

1952 births
Algerian footballers
Ligue 1 players
People from Béjaïa Province
USM Alger players
Living people
Association football goalkeepers
21st-century Algerian people